The 2009–10 Morehead State Eagles men's basketball team represented Morehead State University in the 2009–10 NCAA Division I men's basketball season. The Eagles were led by head coach Donnie Tyndall in his fourth year leading the team. Morehead State played their home games at Ellis Johnson Arena in Morehead, Kentucky, as members of the Ohio Valley Conference. 

The Eagles finished conference play with an 15–3 record, earning the second seed in the Ohio Valley tournament. Morehead State advanced to the OVC Championship game, but were defeated in the title game by Murray State.

Morehead State failed to qualify for the NCAA tournament, but were invited to the 2010 College Basketball Invitational. The Eagles won their first game in the CBI, but were eliminated in the quarterfinals by Boston University, 91–89, in overtime.

The Eagles finished the season with a 24–11 record.

Roster 

Source

Schedule and results

|-
!colspan=9 style=|Exhibition

|-
!colspan=9 style=|Regular season

|-
!colspan=9 style=| Ohio Valley tournament

|-
!colspan=9 style=| CBI

References

Morehead State Eagles men's basketball seasons
Morehead State
Morehead State
Morehead State men's basketball
Morehead State men's basketball